Elínrós Líndal is an entrepreneur in fashion design who co-founded Ella clothing in Reykjavík.

Author Jo Piazza interviewed her, and she was mentioned in the New York Post.

References 

Year of birth missing (living people)
Living people
2011 establishments in Iceland
2015 disestablishments in Europe
Reykjavík University alumni